V.O.S is a 2009 Spanish comedy film directed and written  by Cesc Gay adapting the eponymous stage play by Carol López which stars Àgata Roca, Paul Berrondo, Andrés Herrera and Vicenta Ndongo.

Plot 
Featuring two women from Barcelona (Clara and Vicky) and two Basque male friends (Manu and Ander), the plot tracks the infatuation of Ander and Clara, the separation of Ander and Vicky and the birth of Clara and Manu's daughter. The dialogue goes back and forth between Catalan, Spanish and some Basque.

Cast

Production 
It was produced by Imposible Films, Marta Esteban PC and TVC with support from ICAA, ICEC and Media Desarrollo.

Release 
Distributed by Alta Classics, the film was theatrically released in Spain on 10 July 2009.

Reception 
Esteve Riambau of Fotogramas gave the film 4 out of 5 stars praising the combination of emotion and reflection as the best thing about the film.

Javier Ocaña of El País considered the film to be a failure, assessing that it only contains a few glimpses of Gay's proven filmmaking ability.

Premis 

|-
| align = "center" rowspan = "2" | 2009 || rowspan = "2" | 24th Mar del Plata International Film Festival || Best Screenplay || Cesc Gay ||  || rowspan = "2" | 
|-
| colspan = "2" | Special Jury Mention || 
|-
| align = "center" rowspan = "2" | 2010 || 65th CEC Medals || Best Supporting Actress || Vicenta Ndongo ||  || 
|-
| 2nd Gaudí Awards || colspan = "2" | Best Film ||  || 
|}

See also 
 List of Spanish films of 2009

References 

2009 comedy films
2009 films
Spanish comedy films
2000s Catalan-language films
2000s Spanish-language films
Spanish films based on plays
2000s Spanish films
Films directed by Cesc Gay
Films set in Barcelona